Please add names of notable painters with a Wikipedia page, in precise English alphabetical order, using U.S. spelling conventions. Country and regional names refer to where painters worked for long periods, not to personal allegiances.

Willem Labeij (1943–2011), Dutch painter
Adélaïde Labille-Guiard (1749–1803), French miniaturist and painter
Félix Labisse (1905–1982), French painter, illustrator and designer
Georges Lacombe (1868–1916)
Márta Lacza (born 1946), Hungarian graphic artist and painter 
Pieter van Laer (1599–1642), French sculptor and painter
Pierre Laffillé (1938–2011), French painter
Emile Lahner (1893–1980), Hungarian/French painter
Annie Rose Laing (1869–1946), Scottish painter
Gerard de Lairesse (1640–1711), Dutch painter and art theorist
Wifredo Lam (1902–1982), Cuban/French painter
Henry Lamb (1883–1960), English painter and physician
George Lambourn (1900–1977), English artist
Aleksandr Ivanovich Laktionov (1910–1972), Soviet painter
Lam Qua (林官, 1801–1860), Chinese portrait painter
Lan Ying (藍瑛, 1585–1664), Chinese painter
Nicolas Lancret (1690–1743), French painter
Myra Landau (born 1926), Romanian/Brazilian painter
Ronnie Landfield (born 1947), American painter
Edwin Landseer (1802–1873), English painter and sculptor
Fitz Hugh Lane (1804–1865), American painter and print-maker
Giovanni Lanfranco (1582–1647), Italian painter
Otto Lange (1879–1944), German painter and graphic artist
Peter Lanyon (1918–1964), English painter
Mikhail Larionov (1881–1964), Russian/Soviet painter
Julio Larraz (born 1944), Cuban/American artist
Carl Larsson (1859–1919), Swedish painter
Ibram Lassaw (1913–2003), American painter
Pieter Lastman (1583–1633), Dutch painter
Philip de László (1869–1937), Hungarian/English painter
Rainer Maria Latzke (born 1950), German painter
Georges de La Tour (1593–1652), French painter
William Langson Lathrop (1859–1938), American painter
Robert Scott Lauder (1803–1869), Scottish painter
Marie Laurencin (1885–1956), French painter and print-maker
Jean-Paul Laurens (1838–1921), French painter and sculptor
John Lavery (1856–1941), Irish painter
Andrew Law (1873–1967), Scottish portrait painter
Edith Lawrence (1890–1973), English painter and textile designer
Jacob Lawrence (1917–2000), American painter
Thomas Lawrence (1769–1830), English painter and Royal Academy of Arts president
Jesús Mari Lazkano (born 1960) Spanish (Basque) painter
Gregorio Lazzarini (1655–1730), Italian painter
Charles Le Brun (1619–1690), French painter, physiognomist and art theorist
Antoine Le Nain (c. 1599 – 1648), French painter
Louis Le Nain (c. 1601 – 1648), French painter
Mathieu Le Nain (1607–1677), French painter
Charles Le Roux (1814–1895), French painter
Henri Le Sidaner (1862–1939), French painter
Benjamin Williams Leader (1831–1923), English painter
Juan de Valdés Leal (1622–1690), Spanish painter and etcher
Georges Emile Lebacq (1876–1950), Belgian painter
Mikhail Lebedev (1811–1837), Russian painter
Lennie Lee (born 1958), South African/English artist
Jules Joseph Lefebvre (1836–1911), French painter, educator and theorist
Silvestro Lega (1826–1895), Italian painter
Fernand Léger (1881–1955), French painter, sculptor and film-maker
Alphonse Legros (1837–1911), French painter, etcher and sculptor
Anton Lehmden (born 1929), Austrian painter, draftsman and print-maker
Wilhelm Leibl (1844–1900), German painter
Frederic Leighton (1830–1896), English painter, draftsman and sculptor
Margaret Leiteritz (1907–1976), German painter
Peter Lely (1618–1680), Dutch/English painter
Ulrich Leman (1885–1988), German painter
Georges Lemmen (1865–1916), Belgian painter
August Lemmer (born 1862), German artist
Tamara de Lempicka (1898–1980), Polish/American painter
Franz von Lenbach (1836–1904), German painter
Leng Mei (冷枚, fl. 1677–1742), Japanese painter
Robert Lenkiewicz (1941–2002), English painter
Achille Leonardi (c. 1800 – 1870), Italian painter
Leonardo da Vinci (1452–1519), Italian artist and polymath
Stanislas Lépine (1835–1892), French painter
Mikhail Yuryevich Lermontov (1814–1841), Russian painter, writer and poet
Niels Lergaard (1893–1982), Danish painter
Alfred Leslie (born 1927), American artist and film-maker
Hans Leu the Elder (1460–1507), Swiss painter
Michael Leunig (born 1945), Australian cartoonist, poet and commentator
Leo Leuppi (1893–1972), Swiss painter, graphic artist and sculptor
Emanuel Leutze (1816–1868), American painter
Jack Levine (1915–2010), American painter, print-maker and satirist
Isaac Levitan (1860–1900), Russian painter
Rafail Levitsky (1847–1940), Russian artist
Dmitry Levitzky (1735–1822), Russian imperial artist
Bill Lewis (born 1953), English artist, story-teller and poet
Wyndham Lewis (1884–1957), English writer, painter and critic
Aertgen van Leyden (1498–1564), Dutch painter, draftsman and stained-glass designer
Lucas van Leyden (1494–1533), Dutch painter and print-maker
Alfred Leyman (1856–1933), English painter
Thyrza Anne Leyshon (1892–1996), Welsh painter of miniatures
Judith Leyster (1609–1660), Dutch painter
André Lhote (1885–1962), French painter
Li Cheng (李成, 919–967), Chinese painter
Li Di (李迪, c. 1100 – post-1197), Chinese imperial court painter
Li Fangying (李方膺, 1696–1755), Chinese painter and magistrate
Li Gonglin (李公麟, 1049–1106), Chinese painter, antiquarian and politician
Li Kan (李衎, 1245–1320), Chinese painter
Li Keran (李可染, 1907–1989), Chinese painter and art educator
Li Mei-shu (李梅樹, 1902–1983), Chinese/Taiwanese painter, sculptor and politician
Li Rongjin (李容瑾, fl. late 13th or 14th c.), Chinese painter
Li Shan (李鳝, 1686–1756), Chinese painter
Li Shida (李士達, fl. 16th c.), Chinese painter
Li Shixing (李士行, 1282–1328), Chinese painter
Li Song (李嵩, fl. 1190–1230), Chinese imperial court painter
Li Tang (李唐, c. 1050–1130), Chinese painter
Li Zai (李在, died 1341), Chinese painter
Liang Kai (梁楷, c. 1140 – c. 1210), Chinese painter
Liao Chi-chun (廖繼春, 1902–1976), Chinese/Taiwanese painter and sculptor
Roy Lichtenstein (1923–1997), American pop artist
Max Liebermann (1847–1935), German painter
Irene Lieblich (1923–2008), Polish/American artist and Holocaust survivor
Josse Lieferinxe (fl. c. 1493–1503/1508), Netherlandish painter
Jan Lievens (1607–1674), Dutch painter
Sándor Liezen-Mayer (1839–1898), Hungarian/German painter and illustrator
Maxwell Gordon Lightfoot (1886–1911), English painter
Bruno Liljefors (1860–1939), Swedish artist
Limbourg brothers (fl. 1385–1416), Dutch/French miniature painters
Lin Liang (林良, 1424–1500), Chinese imperial painter
Lin Tinggui (林庭珪, fl. 1174–1189), Chinese painter
Amalia Lindegren (1814–1891), Swedish artist and painter
Emil Lindenfeld (1905–1986), Hungarian/American painter
Arlington Nelson Lindenmuth (1856–1950), American painter
Allan Linder (born 1966), American painter, sculptor and writer
Lionel Lindsay (1874–1961), Australian artist
Carl Walter Liner (1914–1997), Swiss painter, connoisseur and dealer
Johannes Lingelbach (1622–1674), Dutch painter
John Linnell (1792–1873), English painter and engraver
Jean-Étienne Liotard (1702–1789), Swiss painter, connoisseur and dealer
Filippino Lippi (1457–1504), Italian painter
Fra Filippo Lippi (c. 1406 – 1469), Italian painter
Oleg Lipchenko (born 1957), Soviet/Canadian artist and illustrator
Arthur Lismer (1885–1969), Canadian painter and educator
Johann Liss (c. 1590 or 1597–1627 or 1631), German painter
Dirck van der Lisse (1607–1669), Dutch painter
El Lissitzky (1890–1941), Soviet artist, designer and architect
Beatrice Ethel Lithiby (1889–1966), English painter
Stephen Little (born 1954), American artist, scholar and administrator
Alexander Litovchenko (1835–1890), Russian painter
Liu Haisu (刘海粟, 1896–1994), Chinese painter and educator
Liu Jue (劉玨, 1409–1472), Chinese painter, calligrapher and poet
Liu Jun (刘俊, fl. late 14th c.), Chinese painter
William Home Lizars (1788–1859), Scottish painter and engraver
Elizabeth Jane Lloyd (1928–1995), English painter and educator
Stefan Lochner (c. 1410 – 1451), German painter
William Mustart Lockhart (1855–1941), Scottish water-colorist
Dorothy Lockwood (1910–1991), English painter
Lojze Logar (1944–2014), Yugoslav/Slovenian painter and graphic artist
Paul Lohse (1902–1988), Swiss painter and graphic artist
Elfriede Lohse-Wächtler (1899–1940), German painter and Nazi Germany murder victim
Germán Londoño (born 1961), Colombian painter and sculptor
Leonard Long (born 1911), Australian painter
McKendree Long (1888–1976), American painter and Presbyterian minister
Barbara Longhi (1552–1638), Italian painter
Pietro Longhi (1702–1785), Italian painter
Charles-André van Loo (1705–1765), French painter
Charles-Amédée-Philippe van Loo (1719–1795), French painter
Jean-Baptiste van Loo (1684–1745), French painter
Louis-Michel van Loo (1707–1771), French painter
Cándido López (1840–1902), Argentinian painter and soldier
Melchior Lorck (1526/1527 – post-1583), Danish/German painter, draftsman and print-maker
Christian August Lorentzen (1746–1828), Danish painter
Pietro Lorenzetti (c. 1280 – 1348), Italian painter
Hew Lorimer (1907–1993), Scottish sculptor
John Henry Lorimer (1856–1936), Scottish painter
Lorenzo Lotto (c. 1480 – 1556/1557), Italian painter, draftsman and illustrator
Károly Lotz (1833–1904) German/Hungarian painter
Morris Louis (1912–1962), American painter German-Hungarian painter
Louisa Matthíasdóttir (1917–2000), Icelandic/American painter
Claude Lorrain (1600–1682), French painter, draftsman and etcher
L. S. Lowry (1887–1976), English painter and draftsman
Lu Guang (陆广, late 13th or 14th century), Chinese painter and poet
Lü Ji (呂紀, born 1477), Chinese painter
Lu Zhi (陸治, c. 1496–1576), Chinese painter, calligrapher and poet
Edward George Handel Lucas (1861–1936), Scottish painter
Edwin G. Lucas (1911–1990), Scottish painter
Maximilien Luce (1858–1941), French painter, illustrator and engraver
Lucebert (1924–1994), Dutch artist
Ștefan Luchian (1868–1917), Romanian painter
John Luke (1906–1975), Irish painter, sculptor and draftsman
George Benjamin Luks (1867–1933), American painter, comics artist and illustrator
Évariste Vital Luminais (1821–1896), French painter
Juan Luna (1857–1899), Filipino painter, sculptor and activist
Henning Jakob Henrik Lund (1875–1948), Greenland painter, lyricist and pastor
J. L. Lund (1777–1867), Danish painter
Johan Lundbye (1818–1848), Danish painter and graphic artist
Vilhelm Lundstrøm (1893–1950), Danish painter
Luo Mu (1622–1706), Chinese painter, poet and writer
Luo Ping (羅聘, 1733–1799), Chinese painter
Luo Zhichuan (羅稚川, fl. 14th century), Chinese painter
Oskar Lüthy (1882–1945), Swiss painter
Laura Muntz Lyall (1860–1930), Canadian painter
Genevieve Springston Lynch (1891–1960), American painter and art teacher

References

References can be found under each entry.

Lists of painters by name